John Edward Wren (30 January 1894 – 1948) was an English footballer who played at half back for Millwall, Bristol City, Notts County and Southport in the first decade following the First World War playing over 170 Football League games.

Career

Jack Wren was born in St Werburghs  Bristol and after playing local football with Greenbank he joined Millwall. After three years with Millwall, during which he made over ?? first-team appearances, Wren moved to the Second Division with Bristol City.

Wren remained with the Ashton Gate club until 1922 making over 100 appearances, before again moving to Notts County.

References

1894 births
Footballers from Bristol
1948 deaths
English footballers
Association football defenders
English Football League players
Millwall F.C. players
Bristol City F.C. players
Notts County F.C. players
Southport F.C. players